Ioan Mera (born 5 January 1987) is a Romanian  professional football official and a former centre back. He is the sporting director of Politehnica Timișoara.

Club career
Mera began his youth career at Avântul Reghin and at 15 years old he was transferred at Poli.

Politehnica Timișoara
He signed in 2003, where he was still young, and he play for second team. He scored his first goal in Liga I match against Universitatea Craiova. Mera makes his European debut against Ajax Amsterdam in away match, score 0–0 .

Loans
Mera was loaned to CFR Timișoara for one year, making eleven appearances and scoring two goals. Next team where Mera was loaned out it was FCM Reșița where he played 16 matches. He was loaned out this time at CS Buftea with another 15 players from second team. He scored one goal in 15 appearances. Mera was loaned out at first divisioner Gloria Buzău where he scored three goals against Argeș Pitești, Gaz Metan Mediaș and FC Vaslui.

On 2 August 2012, Mera joined Russian Premier League side FC Alania Vladikavkaz on a three-year contract.

On 24 February 2014, Mera joined Liga I side ACS Poli Timișoara on a one-year contract.

On 19 January 2017, Mera joined Liga II side ASU Politehnica Timișoara on a free transfer.

Honours
FC Politehnica Timișoara
Liga II: 2011–2012

External links
 
 

1987 births
Living people
People from Reghin
Romanian footballers
Association football defenders
CSM Reșița players
FC CFR Timișoara players
FC Gloria Buzău players
FC Politehnica Timișoara players
LPS HD Clinceni players
FC Spartak Vladikavkaz players
AFC Săgeata Năvodari players
FC Rapid București players
FC Taraz players
SSU Politehnica Timișoara players
Liga I players
Liga II players
Russian Premier League players
Kazakhstan Premier League players
Romanian expatriate footballers
Expatriate footballers in Russia
Romanian expatriate sportspeople in Russia